Thato Sikwane (born 15 October 1972), better known by his stage name DJ Fresh, is a Motswana disk jockey, producer and entrepreneur based in South Africa. He is most well-known for his career on 5FM and Metro FM.

Sikwane previously worked for YFM in Johannesburg, South Africa. During the 1990s, he released a series of South African house music records, mostly named Fresh House Flava. Different volumes of the compilations were released.

Life and career
Sikwane developed interest on deejaying while he was in Botswana before relocating to South Africa, in 1994 to pursue his studies and obtained a Media Studies diploma at Johannesburg's Boston Media House.

Sikwane obtained the opportunity to work at YFM while he was completing his third year and spent 8 years at the station before moving to 5FM's popular "Drive Time" slot.

He was a radio presenter at 5FM for more than 10 years before moving to Metro FM in 2017, where the "Fresh Breakfast Show" became one of the station's most-loved slots.
 
In August 2019, Metro FM fired him after a listener complained to the BCCSA about the strong language he used during a live broadcast. Fresh took over 947's Drive Time show, from which he was also fired after being accused of rape.
 
He has also stepped on television shows such as Idols SA, SA's Got Talent and Tropika Island of Treasure SA as a guest judge.

In 2002, Sikwane married Thabiso Sikwane. They have three children together. In 2020, the couple separated and began the divorce process.

In 2022, Sikwane started a record label with Zimbabwean born producer/dj, Tich Ponde who goes by the name of Shona SA which focuses mainly on Afro House music, the name of the record label is "Domboshaba Records". Sikwane and Ponde also merged to become "Domboshaba Duo" and have released an album called the beginning which was released in October of 2022 and features artists such as Rok'it Man, Nomvula SA and Audius just to name a few.

Discography

 Definition of House
 Mzansi House
 Fresh House Flava
 DJ Ski VS Big Dawg
 Voices of Hope
 The Beginning

International tour
Aside from South Africa, DJ Fresh has toured in these cities worldwide:
 Miami, United States
 London, United Kingdom
 Moscow, Russia
 Dubai, United Arab Emirates

References

1972 births
Living people
Botswana television producers
South African television producers
Botswana emigrants to South Africa
South African radio personalities
Botswana radio presenters
South African radio presenters